IOK may refer to:
 Indian-occupied Kashmir, the name used by Pakistan for the portion of Kashmir under Indian administration
 Island of Kesmai, an early online game
 IOK Media, a South Korean media company
 IOK-1, a galaxy in the constellation of Coma Berenices